Leucaloa eugraphica is a moth of the family Erebidae, subfamily Arctiinae. The species was first described by Francis Walker in 1865. It is known from South Africa and Lesotho.

The larvae feed on  Thunbergia alata, Heliotropium sp., Lonicera sempervirens, Tagetes erecta and Acacia mearnsii

References
Walker, 1865. List of the Specimens of Lepidopterous Insects in the Collection of the British Museum. Part XXXI.– Supplement. 31 (1864): i–iv, 1–321.

Moths described in 1865
Lepidoptera of South Africa
Spilosomina
Moths of Sub-Saharan Africa